The Orange Lawn Tennis Club is the second oldest tennis club in New Jersey.  Located in South Orange, it was established after the Seabright Lawn Tennis and Cricket Club. 

In 1887, Orange Lawn hosted the first men's doubles event of the US Open, then called the U.S. National Championship. The club also hosted the 1946 Davis Cup and the Eastern Lawn Championship.

Former tournaments
Former notable tournaments staged by the club.
 Eastern Grass Court Championships
 Middle States Championships
 Mutual Benefit Life Open
 Mutual Benefit Open Championship
 Orange Spring Tournament
 Orange LTC Open
 Orange Invitation
 South Orange Open
 Tennis Week Open

References

External links

Sports clubs in the United States
South Orange, New Jersey
1880 establishments in New Jersey
Sports clubs established in 1880
South Orange Open
Tennis venues in New Jersey